Davidiella dianthi is a fungal plant pathogen infecting carnations.

References

External links 
 Index Fungorum
 USDA ARS Fungal Database

Fungal plant pathogens and diseases
Ornamental plant pathogens and diseases
Davidiellaceae
Fungi described in 2003